Jerry Jones (born 1942) is an American businessman and owner of the NFL's Dallas Cowboys.

Jerry Jones may also refer to:

Sports
 Jerry Jones Jr. (born 1969), American football executive, son of the above
 Jerry Jones (American football, born 1895) (1895–1938), American football player and coach; National Football League player (1920–1924)
 Jerry Jones (American football, born 1944), American football player

Others
 Jerry H. Jones (born 1939), American political aide
 Jerry Jones Guitars, a guitar manufacturing company based in Nashville, United States
 Jerry Jones, the graphic artist who did the artwork for the computer game series, Catacomb 3-D
 Jerry Jones (singer), singer and songwriter in the experimental rock band Trophy Scars

See also
 Gerry Jones (disambiguation)
 Jeremy Jones (disambiguation)

Jones, Jerry